Cristian Dan Preda (born October 26, 1966) is a Romanian professor and politician.

He is professor of political science at the University of Bucharest and was between 2009 and 2019 a Member of the European Parliament.

Education and academic career

Cristian Preda was born in Bucharest, Romania. He graduated with a BA in Philosophy at Bucharest University in 1991 and in the same year, he obtained his MA (D.E.A.) in History of Philosophy at Paris I Pantheon-Sorbonne University, with notation "very good".

He continued his graduate studies with master, doctoral and postdoctoral studies funded by French Government, Erasmus Programme, Agence Universitaire de la Francophonie and New Europe College. In 1998 he obtained a Ph.D. in Political Science from the EHESS, Paris with "summa cum laude, with the felicitations of the jury in unanimity".

From 1992, he teaches at the Faculty of Political Science, University of Bucharest. He is a full tenure professor and dean on the Faculty. From 2005, he is also a doctoral supervisor in Political Sciences.

Public and political career

Between March 1999 and December 2000, Cristian Preda was the presidential adviser for domestic policies of the Romanian President Emil Constantinescu.

In October 2001 Cristian Preda became a project manager of the branches of the Central and Eastern Europe Office of the Francophony University Agency (Agence universitaire pour la Francophonie). From 2002, he is a member of regional commission of experts for this organisation.

On September 21, 2005 he was assigned junior ministry for Francophonie in the Romanian Foreign Ministry and personal representative of the Romanian President Traian Băsescu. In this quality, he took an important part in preparation of the Francophonie Summit in Bucharest, in September 2006.

On March 15, 2007 Cristian Preda became presidential adviser for education and research and continued to be the personal representative for Francophonie for President Traian Băsescu.

At the beginning of 2009, Cristian Preda decided to become a member of the Romanian Liberal Democratic Party. He was nominated on the 4th position in the list of Liberal Democratic Party for the European Parliament elections on June 7, 2009. He was elected for a 5 years mandate and became a member in the Foreign Affairs Committee of the European Parliament. In June, 2012, Cristian Preda became a prime-vice president of the Liberal Democratic Party.

In 2014 Preda joined the People's Movement Party founded by Traian Băsescu and was re-elected to the European Parliament. He is the spokesman of the European People's Party Group on foreign affairs and First Vice-Chair of the Subcommittee on Human Rights.

Publishing 

Cristian Preda is the author of several volumes on:

(a) The evolution of the Romanian political thought:
 Modernitatea politică şi românismul, Nemira, 1998;
 Occidentul nostru, Nemira, 1999;
 Staulul şi sirena. Dilemele unui marxist român, Nemira, 2002;
 Contribuţii la istoria intelectuală a politicii româneşti, Meridiane, 2003;
(b) The history of liberalism:

 Le libéralisme du désespoir. Tradition libérale et critique du totalitarisme dans les années 1938–1960, University of  Bucharest, 2000;
 Liberalismul, Nemira, 2000, IInd Ed. Humanitas, 2003;
 Mic dicţionar de gândire politică liberală, Humanitas, 2004;

(c) Electoral systems in the Romanian political history:
 România postcomunistă şi România interbelică, Meridiane, 2002;
 Partide şi alegeri în România postcomunistă, Nemira, 2005;
 Regimul, partidele şi sistemul politic din România (with Sorina Soare, Nemira, 2008).

Cristian Preda authored or coauthored over 60 scientific studies and articles in collective volumes and Romanian and foreign political science journals. He was also a regular contributor to the 22, Dilema, Observator cultural magazines.

In parallel, he worked as a translator for Humanitas, Babel, Anastasia, Meridiane and Nemira publishing houses. He is the coordinator of political sciences collections: Societatea politică (at Ed. Nemira, 1998–2002), Polis (at Ed. Humanitas, 2003–2004) and Biblioteca de politică (at Ed. Nemira, din 2004). He was a writer at Sfera Politicii (1992–1996) and Polis (1995–1997).

Cristian Preda is an editor of Romanian political sciences journal Studia Politica.

Prizes and distinctions
 The Nemira prize for debut 1997;
  Commander of the Serviciul Credincios National Order (December, 2002);
  Knight of the Steaua României National Order (Order of the Star of Romania) (2009);
  Officer of the Belgian Léopold Order (July, 2008);
  Grand Officer of the Order of the Crown, 2009;
  Knight of the French Légion d'honneur Order (January 2009).

Associations
 Member of the Social Science Centre at the University of Bucharest (1993–1994)
 Member of the Romanian Political Science Association (as of 1995)
 Member of the Group for Social Dialogue (as of 1995)
 Member of the Political Science Institute of the University of Bucharest (as of 1995)

References

External links
 Cristian Preda's site
 Cristian Preda's Page on European Parliament site

1966 births
Living people
Academic staff of the University of Bucharest
Democratic Liberal Party (Romania) MEPs
MEPs for Romania 2009–2014
Romanian presidential advisors

Grand Officers of the Order of the Crown (Belgium)
MEPs for Romania 2014–2019
People's Movement Party MEPs
Freedom, Unity and Solidarity Party politicians